Tunnels of Doom is a role-playing video game programmed by Kevin Kenney for the TI-99/4A home computer and published by Texas Instruments on December 31, 1982. It was available in two formats: cartridge with accompanying disk and cartridge with cassette.

Based loosely on the tabletop role-playing game Dungeons & Dragons, it is a dungeon crawl in which players control the fates of 1–4 characters as they navigate a maze of tunnels. Texas Instruments used the game in its marketing, citing it as entertainment software involving "strategy and logic".

Gameplay
The game has four character  classes: hero, fighter, rogue, and wizard. In a single character game, only "hero" is used.

Upon encountering an enemy, the game transitions to a separate, graphical, overhead battle screen, where a tactical turn-based combat system is used that allows for movement and positioning. It's possible to listen at doors for sounds of monsters, which can be negotiated with in combat as well.

Legacy
In 2008, Howard Kistler of DreamCodex developed a revised version of the game with the permission of Kevin Kenney.

Notes

References

Video game cleanup
Role-playing video games
Cooperative video games
TI-99/4A games
1982 video games
Texas Instruments games